Adi Asilina Davila Toganivalu is a Fijian academic and businesswoman.

It was announced on 7 January 2006 that Toganivalu had been appointed to the board of the Fiji Times Ltd., the first woman to hold such a position.  The appointment, which is for three years, was approved by News Limited in Sydney, Australia, the parent company of the Fiji Times.  She was chosen to fill a vacancy caused by the resignation of Ratu Joni Madraiwiwi, left the board following his election to the Vice-Presidency of Fiji at the beginning of 2005.

Toganivalu is a member of the Vuanirewa clan, the traditional rulers of Lau and is sister to Ratu Sir Kamisese Mara, the former President and Prime Minister.  She was educated at the University of Southern Queensland in Toowoomba, Australia, whence she graduated with bachelor's and master's degrees in education.  Her career began in 1966 with a supervisory position with the YWCA kindergarten in Suva, and subsequently taught in Toowoomba while studying for her master's degree.

In the leadup to the 2022 Fijian general election she was one of a group of women who challenged the constitutionality of a new electoral law which required married women to re-register as voters.

References

Fijian chiefs
People from Lakeba
Vuanirewa
University of Southern Queensland alumni
Year of birth missing (living people)
Living people